The Musgravetown Group is a terminal Ediacaran stratigraphic group of terrestrialish sandstones, lavas and tuffs cropping out in Newfoundland.

It corresponds temporally to the Signal Hill Group further east.

References

Geology of Newfoundland and Labrador